François Dupeyron (14 August 195025 February 2016) was a French film director and screenwriter. He directed 17 films between 1977 and 2015.  His film La Chambre des officiers was entered into the 2001 Cannes Film Festival.

Filmography

References

External links
 

1950 births
2016 deaths
People from Landes (department)
French film directors
French male screenwriters
French screenwriters
Best Director Lumières Award winners